Stephan Albani (born 3 June 1968) is a German politician of the Christian Democratic Union (CDU) who has been a member of the German Bundestag since the federal election in 2013.

Early life and career
Albani was born in Göttingen, and graduated from high school in 1987 in Norderstedt. From 1989 to 1994 he studied physics at the Georg-August-Universität Göttingen with a degree as Diplomphysiker. He is Managing Partner of Hörzentrum (Hearing Center) GmbH Oldenburg since 1996, since 2001 managing director of HörTech gGmbH Oldenburg.

Political career

Albani has been a member of the German Bundestag since the 2013 national elections. He has since been serving on the Committee on Education, Research and Technology Assessment, where he is his parliamentary group's rapporteur on health research. In 2022, he also joined the Subcommittee on Global Health.

In addition to his committee assignments, Albani has served as member of the Parliamentary Friendship Group for Relations with the SADC States (2013-2017); chair of the Parliamentary Friendship Group for Relations with the States of South-Eastern Europe (Albania, Kosovo, Macedonia, Montenegro, Serbia) (2016-2018); chair of the German-Irish Parliamentary Friendship Group (2018–2021); and chair of the German-Egyptian Parliamentary Friendship Group (since 2022).

Other activities
 German National Association for Student Affairs, Ex-Officio Member of the Board of Trustees (since 2022)
 Helmholtz Association of German Research Centres, Ex-Officio Member of the Senate (since 2022)
 Eurasian Parliamentary Group on TB (EPGTB), Co-Chairman (since 2016)
 EWE Baskets Oldenburg, Member of the Advisory Board
 German Foundation for World Population (DSW), Member of the Parliamentary Advisory Board
 German Military Reserve Association, Member
 Bundeswehr-Sozialwerk, Member
 Oldenburg Institute for Information Technology (OFFIS), Member of the Supervisory Board
 German Medical Technology Alliance (GMTA), Member of the Board (2004-2013)

Personal life
Albani is married, Protestant, has three children and lives in Petersfehn in Ammerland, where he is deputy chairman of his party.

References

External links

Official website

Members of the Bundestag for Lower Saxony
Living people
1968 births
Politicians from Göttingen
People from Ammerland
Members of the Bundestag 2021–2025
Members of the Bundestag 2017–2021
Members of the Bundestag 2013–2017
Members of the Bundestag for the Christian Democratic Union of Germany